is a Japanese figure skater. He is the 2023 World University Games silver medalist and 2022 Coupe du Printemps silver medalist. He is also the 2022 World Junior bronze medalist and 2018–19 Japan junior national champion.

Personal life 
Tatsuya Tsuboi was born in Okazaki, Aichi. As of 2022, he is a student at Kobe University.

Career

Early career 
Tsuboi began to skate at the age of 7. 

After making his international junior debut at the 2017 edition of the Coupe du Printemps toward the end of the 2016–17 season, Tsuboi made his Junior Grand Prix debut the following autumn, placing fifth at both the 2017 JGP Belarus and 2017 JGP Italy. After winning the bronze medal at the 2017–18 Japan Junior Championships, he finished thirteen at the senior level. He returned to the Coupe du Printemps, this time winning gold.

Tsuboi did not compete on the 2018–19 Junior Grand Prix, but won the junior silver medal at the Asian Open Trophy. He won gold at the 2018–19 Japan Junior Championships, and finished seventh at the senior level, as a result of which he was assigned to compete at the 2019 World Junior Championships. Tsuboi finished fourteen there.

2021–2022 season: Junior World bronze
After appearing only domestically over the following two seasons, partially as a result of the COVID-19 pandemic, Tsuboi became more active in the 2021–22 season, even though Japan opted not to assign skaters to the Junior Grand Prix. He was the silver medalist at the 2021–22 Japan Junior Championships, and placed ninth at the senior edition. These placements earned him an assignment to the 2022 World Junior Championships. Also given precursor assignments to the Bavarian Open and the Coupe du Printemps, he won gold at the former at the junior level and silver at latter at the senior level.

The World Junior Championships were originally scheduled for March in Sofia. However, as a result of both the Omicron variant and the Russo-Ukrainian War, they could not be held in their original location, and were moved to Tallinn in April. As well, the International Skating Union banned Russian and Belarusian athletes from competing, significantly altering the figure skating field. Tsuboi finished fifth in the short program with a new personal best score. He was third in the free skate, rising to third overall to win the bronze medal.

2022–2023 season: Senior debut 
Moving to the senior level permanently, Tsuboi was assigned to make his Grand Prix debut at the MK John Wilson Trophy, where he finished fifth. At his second event, the Grand Prix of Espoo, he was fifth in the short program but rose to fourth after the free skate, where he set new personal bests in that segment and overall. He described nothing but "happiness" with the results.

Tsuboi finished ninth at the 2022–23 Japan Championships, and was subsequently assigned to compete at the 2023 Winter World University Games. He won the silver medal.

Programs

Competitive highlights 
GP: Grand Prix; CS: Challenger Series; JGP: Junior Grand Prix

2016–17 season to present

Earlier seasons

Detailed results 
Current personal best scores are highlighted in bold.

Senior level

Junior level

References

External links 
 

Japanese male single skaters
2002 births
Living people
People from Okazaki, Aichi
World Junior Figure Skating Championships medalists
Competitors at the 2023 Winter World University Games
Medalists at the 2023 Winter World University Games
21st-century Japanese people
Universiade medalists in figure skating
Universiade silver medalists for Japan